Quiet the Room is the debut studio album from indie folk musician Skullcrusher. The album was released on October 14, 2022, by Secretly Canadian.

Track listing
All songs written by Helen Ballentine.

References

2022 debut albums
Secretly Canadian albums